The Lost Generation is the second studio album by American rapper Shyheim. It was released on May 28, 1996 via Noo Trybe Records. Production was handled by RNS, DR Period, Peter Lord, The King of Chill, V. Jeffrey Smith, L.E.S., RZA and Tone Capone. It features guest appearances from GP Wu, 9th Prince, DV Alias Khrist, Killa Sin, Smoothe da Hustler, Trigga tha Gambler, Squig, Kameelah Williams and Lamisha Grinstead. The album peaked at #63 on the Billboard 200 and at #10 on Top R&B/Hip-Hop Albums in the United States. Its lead single, "This Iz Real", peaked at #84 on the Hot R&B/Hip-Hop Songs and #26 on the Hot Rap Songs.

Track listing

Charts

References

External links

1996 albums
Shyheim albums
Albums produced by RZA
Albums produced by L.E.S. (record producer)